Davey was appointed as Acting Leader of the Liberal Democrats following the resignation of Jo Swinson. Davey announced his first frontbench team as Acting Leader in January 2020.

Davey was elected permanent Leader on 27 August 2020 and assembled a new Frontbench Team in the following days.

Liberal Democrat Frontbench Team as elected Leader (2020–)

Other roles and spokespeople

Liberal Democrat Frontbench Team as Acting Leader (2019–2020)

See also
Cabinet of the United Kingdom
Official Opposition Shadow Cabinet (United Kingdom)

References

External links
 Liberal Democrats: Spokespeople

Politics of the United Kingdom
Liberal Democrats (UK) frontbench team